This page is an overview of the qualification criteria for the 2015 UCI Road World Championships.

Elite events

Elite men's road race

Qualification was based on performances on the UCI run tours during 2015. Results from January to the middle of August counted towards the qualification criteria on both the 2015 UCI World Tour and the UCI Continental Circuits across the world, with the rankings being determined upon the release of the numerous tour rankings on August 15, 2015.

The following 51 nations qualified.

Elite women's road race

Qualification was based mainly on the 2015 UCI Nation Ranking as of 15 August 2015. The first five nations in this classification qualified seven riders to start, the next ten nations qualified six riders to start and the next five nations qualified five riders to start. Other nations and non ranked nations had the possibility to send three riders to start.

  (7)
  (7)
  (7)
  (7)
  (7)
  (6)
  (6)
  (6)
  (6)
  (6)
  (6)
  (6)
  (6)
  (6)
  (6)
  (5)
  (5)
  (5)
  (5)
  (5)
 Other nations (3)

Moreover, the outgoing World Champion and continental champions were also able to take part in the race on top of the nation numbers.

Elite men's time trial

All National Federations were allowed to enter four riders for the race, with a maximum of two riders to start. In addition to this number, the outgoing World Champion and the current continental champions were also able to take part.

Elite women's time trial

All National Federations were allowed to enter four riders for the race, with a maximum of two riders to start. In addition to this number, the outgoing World Champion and the current continental champions were also able to take part.

Men's team time trial

It was an obligation for all 2015 UCI ProTeams to participate. As well as this, invitations were sent to the 20 leading teams of the 2015 UCI Europe Tour, the top 5 leading teams of the 2015 UCI America Tour and 2015 UCI Asia Tour and the leading teams of the 2015 UCI Africa Tour and 2015 UCI Oceania Tour on August 15, 2015. Teams that accepted the invitation within the deadline had the right to participate. Every participating team were allowed to register nine riders from its team roster, with the exception of stagiaires, and had to select six riders to compete in the event.

Women's team time trial

Invitations were sent to the 25 leading UCI Women's Teams in the UCI Team Ranking as of August 15, 2015. Teams that accepted the invitation within the deadline had the right to participate. Every participating team had the opportunity to register nine riders from its team roster, with the exception of stagiaires, and had to select six riders to compete in the event.

Also a few lower ranked American UCI teams were invited.

Teams that did not accept the invitation are listed below in italics.

Under-23 events

Men's under-23 road race

Qualification

Qualification was based on performances on the UCI run tours and the Men Under 23 Nations' Cup during 2015. Results from January to the middle of August counted towards the qualification criteria. In addition to this number, the current continental champions were also able to take part. The outgoing World Champion, Matej Mohorič, did not compete as he was no longer eligible – he moved to the UCI ProTeam  for the 2015 season. If a nation is included in the final classification of the Men Under 23 Nations’ Cup, but that nation is not yet qualified, it may register 6 riders, 3 of whom will be a starters. The first 5 nations of the final classification of the Men Under 23 Nations’ Cup are entitled to an extra rider.

In addition to this number the current continental champions were also able to take part.

Men's under-23 time trial

All National Federations were allowed to enter four riders for the race, with a maximum of two riders to start. In addition to this number, the outgoing World Champion and the current continental champions were also able to take part. The outgoing world champion Campbell Flakemore did not compete, as he was no longer eligible to contest under-23 races.

Junior events

Men's junior road race

Women's junior road race

All National Federations were allowed to enter eight riders for the race, with a maximum of four riders to start. In addition to this number, the outgoing World Champion and the current continental champions were also able to take part. The outgoing World Champion, Amalie Dideriksen, did not compete as she was no longer eligible to contest junior races.

Men's junior time trial

All National Federations were allowed to enter four riders for the race, with a maximum of two riders to start. In addition to this number, the outgoing World Champion and the current continental champions were also able to take part.

Women's junior time trial

All National Federations were allowed to enter four riders for the race, with a maximum of two riders to start. In addition to this number the current continental champions were also able to take part. The outgoing World Champion, Séverine Eraud, did not compete as she was no longer eligible to contest junior races.

References

2015 UCI Road World Championships
Qualification for the UCI Road World Championships